Foch was the second  that served with the French Navy from 1963 to 2000. The carrier was the second warship named in honour of the Marshal of France, British Field Marshal and Marshal of Poland Ferdinand Foch.

After serving with the French Navy, the vessel was sold to Brazil and renamed . The Brazilian Navy scuttled her on 3 February 2023 in the Atlantic Ocean.

Design

The Clemenceau-class aircraft carriers, of which Foch, renamed and reflagged as São Paulo in 2000, was the last surviving member, were of conventional CATOBAR design. The forward aircraft elevator was to starboard, and the rear elevator was positioned on the deck edge to save hangar space. The forward of two  catapults were at the bow to port, the aft catapult was on the forward area of angled landing deck.

History

The draft statute, prepared by the Naval General Staff in 1949, asked for four aircraft carriers of 20,000 tons to be available in two phases. At its meeting of 22 August 1949, the Supreme Council of the Navy was even more ambitious, where they proposed a six aircraft carrier fleet. On 15 July 1952, the French Navy still wanted two to five for the French Navy (not available to NATO). According to RCM 12, the final document of the Lisbon Conference of 1952, France should make available to NATO an aircraft carrier on D-day, two on day 30, three on day 180.

But from 1953, the Navy had to revise its ambitions downwards, with a target of three aircraft carriers.

The PA 54 Clemenceau, budgeted in 1953, was delayed until November 1955, the PA 55 Foch, budgeted for 1955, was delayed until February 1957. Between 1980 and 1981, she underwent a study to certify the platform before catapulting aircraft, carrying missiles, bombs, AM-39 Exocet and tactical nuclear bombs. Like her sister ship , Foch underwent a modernization and refit, replacing four of her eight  guns with two Crotale air-defense systems. Unlike Clemenceau, Foch also received in 1997 two Sadral launchers (for 6 Mistral missiles each); those launchers were purchased by France in 1994.

The Dassault Rafale was test flown from Foch (but not Clemenceau) after deck modifications in 1992 and operated from this carrier after further 1995–96 deck modifications.

After a 37-year career in the French Navy, on 15 November 2000, the carrier was sold to the Brazilian Navy, and renamed .

Principal operations 

Main naval operations for the époque were conducted by sister ship Clemenceau. Foch was engaged in the following:

 1966: Foch participated, with Alfa Force, to the campaign of French nuclear experimentation in the Pacific.
 1978 : during the Independence of Djibouti, Foch deployed in the Red Sea in Operation Saphir II.
 1983 : Foch participated to the support of the French contingent deployed in Lebanon within the cadre of the Operation Olifant missions. The carrier would rotate with Clemenceau providing constant on station air support to French peacekeepers in the Multinational Force in Lebanon FSMB and the United Nations Interim Force in Lebanon UNIFIL.
 1993–1999 : Foch was regularly engaged in Operations Balbuzard, Salamandre and Trident in the Adriatic Sea during the engagement of France in ex-Yugoslavia within the cadre of FORPRONU and the SFOR and KFOR. The carrier ensured the security of French elements deployed on the ground, and conducted aerial raids under the command of the United Nations and NATO.

Combat history
In 1977 F-8 Crusaders from 14.F squadron from Foch participated in the Saphir missions over Djibouti. On 7 May 1977, two Crusaders went separately on patrol against what were supposedly French Air Force (4/11 Jura squadron) F-100 Super Sabres stationed at Djibouti. The leader intercepted two fighters and initiated a dogfight as part of the training exercise, but quickly called his wingman for help as he had actually engaged two Yemeni MiG-21 Fishbeds. The two French fighters switched their master armament to "on" but, ultimately, everyone returned to their bases. This was the only combat interception by French Crusaders.

In October 1984, France sent Foch for Operation Mirmillon off the coast of Libya, in response to tension in the Gulf of Sidra.

She was involved in the Yugoslav Wars between July and August 1993, in February and March 1994, and in February and from May to July 1994 in support of UN operations. She also was part of NATO's Allied force operations with Super Étendards flying strike missions over Serbia in 1999. She was forced to withdraw early four months into her deployment, the longest in her service history, due to problems with her catapult system and other issues.

In 2000, Foch made her last deployment by leading Task Force 473 on a four month around-the-world tour.

In fiction

Foch was featured prominently in the 1995 film Crimson Tide as the setting for several televised news reports by American journalist Richard Valeriani (playing himself in the film) about the ongoing conflict in Russia. Foch was used in this role after the U.S. Navy refused to assist in the film's production, thus removing the possibility of filming on board a U.S. carrier.

Gallery

Notes

References

Bibliography

Sources
 
</ref>

External links

CV Foch Aircraft Carrier Foch on Alabordache 

Clemenceau-class aircraft carriers
Ships built in France
1959 ships

zh:福熙號航空母艦